The Battle of Yenişehir, which took place between Yavuz Sultan Selim and Şehzade Ahmed (son of Bayezid II) in 1513, ended with the victory of Selim I and also ended the fight for the throne.

Background
Bayezid II abdicated, and his son Selim was enthroned in Istanbul on April 24, 1512. Yavuz's elder brother, Şehzade Ahmed, did not accept this and declared his reign in Konya and established a government there. Şehzade Süleyman was appointed as the Istanbul guard. Sultan Selim entered Bursa with his forces and his nephew, Şehzade Alaaddin, who was the governor of the city, fled. Yavuz, who spent the winter here, wrote fake letters to his elder brother Şehzade Korkut, who was the governor of Manisa, in the mouth of his Pashas, inviting him to rebellion. Şehzade Korkut, who answered in the affirmative, was executed and Yavuz had no rivals other than his elder brother. Ahmed Sultan, who was in Afyon, first withdrew to Ankara and then to Malatya after Malkoçoğlu Turali Bey attacked him and sent his two sons to Ismail I to ask for help. Yavuz; This time, he wrote fake letters to his brother in the mouth of their Pasha, writing that in case of a war they would change sides and arrest Yavuz. Believing these words, Ahmed Sultan marched against his brother from Amasya, which he had already occupied, with a force of about 30,000.

Battle
Learning that his brother had come upon him, Yavuz Sultan Selim prepared his army to implement the last stage of his plan and went to Yenişehir to meet him. Ahmed Sultan, who dispersed the vanguard of Yavuz, met his brother in Yenişehir on Sunday, April 24. A bloody war ensued. The large irregular army of Ahmed Sultan could not destroy the small number of regular army and suffered many casualties in the face of firepower. When the pasha realized that his letters were also lies, he tried to escape, but it was too late. Already trapped by the flip movement, Ahmed Sultan made his last stand, but he was caught by his Prince Osman and they were strangled with a bowstring by the Kapıcıbaşı Sinan Ağa. the tactic was also used by another military genius.

Aftermath
Ahmed Sultan, who was strangled on the battlefield, was buried in Bursa and his son, Osman, in Amasya. Şehzade Murad fled to Iran, while Süleyman and Alaaddin Şehzades fled to Egypt. According to rumors, the fleeing Princes died in the countries they fled to for various reasons. After all this, Yavuz Sultan Selim, who ended the fight for the throne, has now finished the internal turmoil and turned his eyes to the growing external problems in the East.

References

Citations 

Kamar, M., 2020. Türk ve İslâm hâkimiyet telâkkileri çerçevesinde isyan suçu. Astana Yayınları.

Şahin, B., 1994. Osmanlı ansiklopedisi. İstanbul: Ağaç Yayıncılık.

Uluçay, C., 1961. Taht uğrunda baş veren sultanlar. İstanbul: de University of Michigan.

Yenişehir